Callopepla flammula is a moth of the subfamily Arctiinae. It was described by Jacob Hübner in 1832. It is found in Espírito Santo, Brazil.

References

Arctiinae